"Disco Dancer" is a song by the American new wave band Devo, written by Mark Mothersbaugh and Gerald Casale. It was the first Devo single that was released without their most prominent drummer, Alan Myers, who was replaced by former Sparks drummer David Kendrick. It was released in 1988 as the first single from their seventh studio album, Total Devo.

Composition
According to Devo bassist and co-songwriter Gerald Casale, he and Mark Mothersbaugh came up with the idea of a character in the vein of John Travolta's from Saturday Night Fever (1977) falling "into a Rip Van Winkle sleep", and then waking up 15 years later to culture shock. In the commentary for their video anthology The Complete Truth About De-Evolution (1993), Mothersbaugh stated that the original inspiration for the song came from Indian films and music videos, likely the 1982 Bollywood film, Disco Dancer.

Music video
Two videos were made for "Disco Dancer", using remixed versions of the track by producer Ivan Ivan. Both videos are similar, but the 12-inch mix video has additional footage, including a topless woman, and was only on promotional VHS tapes distributed to nightclubs. The video footage was recorded from two parties that the band threw, one in New York City and the other one in Los Angeles. The NYC footage was recorded in black and white, while the L.A. footage was shot in color, with scenes from both parties being intercut in the video. According to Casale, the video failed to receive airplay after first being aired on MTV's "Smash or Trash?," in which a video was aired and viewers would call in and vote on it. The video was "trashed" and MTV refused to air it after that.

Track listing
 12-inch single (Enigma V-75511)
 "Disco Dancer (7-inch Version)" – 4:15
 "Disco Dancer (12-inch Version)" – 6:30
 "Disco Dancer (Bonus Beats)" – 4:20
 "Disco Dancer (7-inch Version)" – 4:15
 "Disco Dancer (12-inch Version)" – 6:30
 "Disco Dancer (Bonus Beats)" – 4:20

 7-inch single (Enigma 7 75023-7)
 "Disco Dancer (7-inch Version)" – 4:15
 "Disco Dancer (Karaoke TV Version)" – 4:15

 CD single (Enigma D3-75511, 7 75511-3)
 "Disco Dancer (7-inch Version)" – 4:15
 "Disco Dancer (12-inch Version)" – 6:32
 "Disco Dancer (Bonus Beats)" – 4:26
 "Disco Dancer (Karaoke Version)" – 4:26

 Cassette single (Enigma 4V-75511)
 "Disco Dancer (7-inch Version)" – 4:15
 "Disco Dancer (12-inch Version)" – 6:30
 "Disco Dancer (Bonus Beats)" – 4:20
 "Disco Dancer (7-inch Version)" – 4:15
 "Disco Dancer (12-inch Version)" – 6:30
 "Disco Dancer (Bonus Beats)" – 4:20

Chart performance

References

External links
 

1998 singles
1998 songs
Devo songs
Songs written by Gerald Casale
Songs written by Mark Mothersbaugh
Enigma Records singles